The Parras pupfish (Cyprinodon latifasciatus) is a small species of freshwater pupfish in the family Cyprinodontidae. It is endemic to the Laguna de Mayrán basin in southern Coahuila, Mexico.  This species was widely thought to be extinct, 1903 being the date of the last recorded observation and it was declared to be extinct in 1930 until a single specimen was accidentally collected from an irrigation canal, in the town of Parras de la Fuente in 2012.

References

Cyprinodon
Taxa named by Samuel Garman
Fish described in 1881
Pupfish, Parras
Fish of Mexican Pacific coast
Taxonomy articles created by Polbot